Bharat Rashtra Samithi (BRS), formerly known as Telangana Rashtra Samithi ( TRS), is an Indian political party which is predominantly active in the state of Telangana. It was founded on 27 April 2001 as by K. Chandrashekar Rao, with a single-point agenda of creating a separate Telangana state with Hyderabad as its capital. It has been instrumental in carrying forth a sustained agitation for the granting of statehood to Telangana.
 
In the 2014 Telangana Assembly Election, the party won a majority of seats and formed the first government of the State with K. Chandrashekar Rao as its chief minister. In the 2014 general election the party won 11 seats, making it the eighth largest party in Lok Sabha, the lower house of the Indian Parliament.
 
After a landslide victory in 2018 Telangana Legislative Assembly election, the party formed the government in the State for the second time. In the 2019 Indian general election, the party's tally has fallen to 9 seats in the Lok Sabha. As of February 2023, the party holds 7 seats in upper house of Rajya Sabha.

The name of the party was changed from Telangana Rashtra Samithi to Bharat Rashtra Samithi on 5 October 2022.

Ideology
On 27 April 2001, Rao resigned as Deputy Speaker of the Telugu Desam Party. He opined that Telangana people were being categorically discriminated against within the undivided State of Andhra Pradesh. Consequently, Rao argued that only the creation of a separate State of Telangana would allow for the alleviation of the people's predicament. Accordingly, KCR founded the Telangana Rashtra Samithi (TRS) Party at Jala Drushyam, Hyderabad in April 2001, with the objective of achieving statehood for Telangana. The party initially won one-third of Mandal Parishad Territorial Constituencies (MPTC) and one-quarter of Zilla Parishad Territorial Constituencies (ZPTC) in Siddipet within sixty days of the formation of the party.

Politics

2004 elections 
In the aftermath of 2004 Andhra Pradesh Legislative Assembly election, the party won 26 state assembly seats and also won 5 parliament seats. The TRS formed an alliance with Indian National Congress and joined the United Progressive Alliance. In September 2006 the party withdrew support for the central government on the grounds of indecision by the government over the delivery of its electoral promise to create Telangana. On 13 September 2006, Rao triggered a by-election in his Lok Sabha constituency of Karimnagar, claiming provocation from one of the Congress MLAs. He won the subsequent by-election with a strong majority.
All TRS MLAs and MPs resigned their positions in April 2008 when the Central government did not meet their demand for a separate state in its latest budget session. The by-election was held on 29 May 2008. In the by-elections, 2008, TRS won 7 out of the 16 assembly segments and 2 out of the 4 loksabha segments that it resigned, a significant defeat for the party. TRS Chief K. Chandrasekhar Rao offered to resign after the by-election losses, but instead remained in office.

2009 elections 
In 2009, TRS formed an alliance with TDP and joined the Bharatiya Janata Party-led National Democratic Alliance. The party contested 45 Assembly and 9 Parliament seats to win only 10 Assembly and 2 parliament seats. This was considered another major defeat.

2014 elections
In the 2014 Assembly and National Elections, TRS did not align with NDA or UPA and fought the elections on its own. TRS, which led the campaign for a separate State for more than a decade, emerged victorious by winning 11 of the 17 Lok Sabha seats and 63 of the 119 Assembly seats, and emerged as the party with the largest vote share in Telangana. The TRS' campaign had no other stars except KCR who addressed over 300 public meetings, heli-hopping around and often addressing more than 10 meetings in a single day. The TRS not only retained its north Telangana stronghold but also made inroads in south Telangana, a Congress bastion.

It was only after the bifurcation of Andhra Pradesh, and the creation of separate Telangana state that the party begun to deliver electoral success. TRS won 63 out of 110 seats it contested in the 2014 Assembly elections in the newly formed state, and went on to form the government. K. Chandrashekar Rao, has taken oath as the first Chief Minister of the new state of Telangana on 2 June 2014.

2018 Telangana Legislative Assembly elections
The TRS Government headed by Chief Minister K. Chandrasekhar Rao on 6 September 2018 dissolved the Legislative Assembly, the first after the formation of Telangana, to pave the way for early elections in the state. The party has announced a list of 104 candidates for elections on the same day.

In 2018 Telangana Legislative Assembly election, held the nearly three months after the house dissolution, the TRS party won the assembly elections with massive majority. Won with 88 constituency seats which is more than 70% of 119 seats.

2019 Indian general election 
In May 2019, TRS Chief Rao flouted the idea of Federal Front, aiming for a non-Congress and non-BJP government at the centre. The party won 9 out of the contested 17 seats, a reduction of two seats from the 2014 election.

Bharat Rashtra Samithi 
The name of the party was changed from Telangana Rashtra Samithi to Bharat Rashtra Samithi on 5 October 2022 to foray into national politics ahead of Next Indian general election. On 6 October 2022, officials from BRS submitted the relevant documents required for name change according to the Representation of the People Act, 1951 to the Election Commission of India in New Delhi. As of October 2022, the party activities are taking place from a rented building at Sardar Patel Marg in Delhi. On 14 November The party office was inaugurated at New Delhi.

Membership
TRS Party president K Chandrasekhar Rao announced a schedule for the membership drive, which began on 3 February 2015, and elections to party committees from the village level. After a spectacular victory in the Assembly and Lok Sabha elections in Telangana, The TRS Party is now focused on strengthening it in the state.

KCR said the TRS Membership Drive 2015 would continue until 20 February. Elections to party committees at different levels would be held during March and April.

TRS party officially started registration process to get membership from 3 February 2015.

Legislative leaders

List of chief ministers
Chief Minister of Telangana

Deputy Chief Ministers of Telangana

Leadership

Electoral performance

Lok Sabha Election

State Legislative Assembly elections

See also
Jaya Jaya He Telangana
Telangana Jagarana Sena

Notes

References

External links 

 

 
Political parties established in 2001
Political parties in Telangana
Regionalist parties in India
2001 establishments in Andhra Pradesh
Centre-right parties in Asia
Conservative parties in India